Ralph Jordon Croucher (born November 14, 1978), better known by his stage name JRDN, is a Canadian R&B recording artist.

Early life 
Ralph Jordon Croucher was born in Halifax, Nova Scotia and moved to Toronto, Ontario at nine months old, where he was raised until the age of 10, when his family returned to Nova Scotia. While he was in Toronto, he lived in Jane and Finch, in the same building as King Lou of the Dream Warriors. The jazz rap pioneer introduced Croucher to hip hop culture at this time. Croucher attended St. Francis Xavier University where he played on the basketball team. After graduation, he played professionally for one year in France.

Career 
Jordon gained music experience by competing in Canadian Idol. This gave him an opportunity to perform with Canadian talent, while gaining television exposure. He also worked with Halifax producer Trobiz and recorded mixtapes with the groups N.E.P and Triple Threat. In 2007, Croucher he began to work with producer Classified who produced Croucher’s debut album No Dress Code in 2007.

2007: No Dress Code
The 13-track record featured singles and videos for "Selfish Times", "Feelin’ Fine", "So Addicted", "Won't Let Go" and "It’s Raining". It earned Croucher the CBC Galaxie Rising Star prize at the 2007 African Nova Scotian Music Awards show, a nomination for Best Urban Single at the 2008 East Coast Music Awards  and an appearance on the CBC Television special, Barenaked East Coast Music. He toured across Canada with Classified and Maestro and opened for Ne-Yo, Snoop Dogg, Rihanna, Nas, and Juelz Santana.

2010: Breakthrough success and IAMJRDN 
Shortening his name to JRDN, Croucher worked with Toronto's Kuya Productions and the songwriting and production team of Sammy Blues and Bobby Brass, who've worked with Nelly, Mase, Ginuwine, Jesse McCartney, Nicole Scherzinger and Akon. JRDN signed to Kuya Productions in 2009. IAMJRDN is the official debut album by JRDN and was released on November 9, 2010. Since its release the album debuted at number 13 on the Canadian R&B Albums Chart. Off his debut album, the first single "U Can Have It All" brought him to mainstream success by reaching number 20 on the Canadian Hot 100 and the music video reached number 5 on the MuchMusic Countdown. The second "Like Magic" reached number 24 on the Canadian Hot 100 with its music video topping the MuchMusic Countdown. "Like Magic" has been certified Gold by Music Canada on September 10, 2012.

He also served as a Youth Ambassador for D250 and was a delegate in the Citizen Voices program.

Discography

Studio albums
 2010: IAMJRDN

Independent albums
 2007: No Dress Code

Reissues
 2011: High Definition

EPs
 2014: JRDN
 2016: Like It 
 2018: Supply & Demand

Singles

As featured artist

References

Sources
 https://web.archive.org/web/20101125102005/http://www.cwofest.ca/act/102
 http://www.thevanguard.ca/Arts/Festivals-%26amp%3B-events/2010-10-25/article-1882157/JRDN-to-perform-at-Music-Week-awards-gala/1
 http://www.popculturemadness.com/interview/JRDN.html
 https://web.archive.org/web/20110708161745/http://www.cityonmyback.com/2010/09/04/news-jrdn-releases-debut-album-november-2nd/
 http://www.muchmusic.com/music/firstspin/jrdn/
 http://www.hiphopcanada.com/tag/jrdn/
 https://web.archive.org/web/20121003073401/http://exclaim.ca/MusicVideo/ClickHear/JRDN-U_Can_Have_It_All_video
 https://web.archive.org/web/20110808205326/http://www.mtv.ca/music/video_type.jhtml?id=1384
 https://web.archive.org/web/20101125102005/http://www.cwofest.ca/act/102
 http://www.metronews.ca/toronto/scene/article/681623--jrdn-makes-for-a-highlight-on-canada-s-pop-r-b-scene
 https://web.archive.org/web/20101017115754/http://eatthis.inmusic.ca/2010/10/eat-this-artist-jrdn.html

External links
 JRDN Official Website of Jordon Croucher
 JRDN's Twitter
  JRDN's Facebook
 JRDN's Myspace

1978 births
21st-century Black Canadian male singers
Black Nova Scotians
Canadian contemporary R&B singers
Canadian hip hop singers
Canadian male singers
Canadian philanthropists
Canadian soul singers
Juno Award for R&B/Soul Recording of the Year winners
Living people
Musicians from Halifax, Nova Scotia